Jordan Jenkins (born 2 August 2001) is an English speedway rider who rides in all three tiers of British Speedway.

Career
He began his British career riding for the Mildenhall Fen Tigers in 2016. He rode for Kent Kings during 2019, although he did ride a couple of meetings for Birmingham in the division above.

Jenkins was made captain of the Mildenhall Fen Tigers in 2021 and led the team to the National Development League Championship.

For the 2022 season, Jenkins signed for the newly reformed Oxford Cheetahs National Development team called the Oxford Chargers and was made captain of the team. In September 2022, he won the National League Riders' Championship. Also in 2022, he continued to ride for the Redcar Bears and signed for the Peterborough Panthers in the top tier SGB Premiership mid-way through the season. He was named the Redcar Bears rider of the year.

In 2023, Jenkins left Redcar and signed for the Oxford Cheetahs for the SGB Championship 2023 and remained with the Chargers for the 2023 NDL season. He also re-signed for Peterborough as their rising star for the SGB Premiership 2023.

References 

2001 births
Living people
British speedway riders
Kent Kings riders
Mildenhall Fen Tigers riders
Oxford Cheetahs riders
Peterborough Panthers riders
Redcar Bears riders